Witagron (or Bitagron) is a Kwinti village in Suriname on the Coppename River at the crossing of the Southern East-West Link from Paramaribo to Apoera in West-Suriname.

In the local language Bitagron means 'Land of my forefathers'. Witagron is the residence of the Kwinti granman.

History

In 1975-76 a Bailey bridge was built across the river to replace the pontoon ferry.

In 1987, during the Surinamese Interior War, Witagron was partially destroyed. After the war, the village was rebuilt by the Stichting Wederopbouw Witagron with aid from the United Nations Development Program. The village is on an important location, because it is the gateway to Central Suriname Nature Reserve, and near the Raleigh Falls which are a major tourist attraction.

Healthcare 
Witagron is home to a Medische Zending healthcare centre.

Notes

References 
 
 

Kwinti settlements
Populated places in Sipaliwini District